Soyauxia velutina is a species of flowering plant from the genus Soyauxia.

References

Peridiscaceae